Ken Flach and Robert Seguso were the defending champions but Seguso did not participate. Flach partnered with Danie Visser but were eliminated in the round robin.

Jeremy Bates and Anders Järryd defeated Mansour Bahrami and Henri Leconte in the final, 6–4, 7–6(7–4) to win the senior gentlemen's invitation doubles tennis title at the 2009 Wimbledon Championships.

Draw

Final

Group A
Standings are determined by: 1. number of wins; 2. number of matches; 3. in two-players-ties, head-to-head records; 4. in three-players-ties, percentage of sets won, or of games won; 5. steering-committee decision.

Group B
Standings are determined by: 1. number of wins; 2. number of matches; 3. in two-players-ties, head-to-head records; 4. in three-players-ties, percentage of sets won, or of games won; 5. steering-committee decision.

External links
 Draw

Men's Invitation Doubles, Senior